"Master Mind" was a comic strip in the British comic magazine Buster. It made its first appearance in the issue dated 8 November 1980, and ran until 1983 when it was replaced with Cliff Hanger. It was written and drawn by Jack Edward Oliver.

Alf Witt was a boy who lived in the town of Flittem, and was not very clever. After falling into a hole, he met a wizard called Madness Madnesson (a reference to Magnus Magnusson, who hosted the television show Mastermind at this time) who gave him super powers. By getting into a telephone booth and saying the mystic word "Pass", Alf Witt would transform into a superhero called Master Mind.

In the strip he would come across a supervillain and ask the readers for help on how to defeat him, this would usually involve puzzles such as anagrams, join the dots, and many others. Master Mind also had a dog that would accompany him, called Bones.

British comic strips
1980 comics debuts
Comics characters introduced in 1980
Comics set in England
Superhero comics
Male characters in comics
Child characters in comics
1983 comics endings